Briefing for a Descent into Hell is a psychological thriller by the British novelist Doris Lessing. It was first published in 1971 and shortlisted for that year's Booker Prize.

Plot 
The novel begins when a well-dressed but dishevelled man is found wandering alone at night on London's Embankment. Unable to remember anything, he is escorted to a psychiatric hospital, where he is identified as Charles Watkins, a professor of Classics at the University of Cambridge. An example of what Lessing called "inner space fiction", the novel contrasts Watkins's fantastical accounts of his own semi-mystical hallucinations – including being adrift on a raft in the Atlantic and flying through outer space – with the doctors' and nurses' increasingly draconian attempts to sedate and "cure" the patient.

Release 
Briefing for a Descent into Hell was first published in hardback in the United Kingdom and United States in 1971 through Jonathan Cape and Alfred A. Knopf, respectively.

Reception 
In a largely negative review in The New York Times, Joan Didion described the novel's grappling with questions of sanity and insanity as "less than astonishing stuff". Didion noted parallels between the novel and the writings of Scottish psychiatrist R. D. Laing.

Further reading

References 

1971 British novels
Psychological thriller novels
Novels by Doris Lessing